In linear algebra, a coefficient matrix is a matrix consisting of the coefficients of the variables in a set of linear equations. The matrix is used in solving systems of linear equations.

Coefficient matrix
In general, a system with  linear equations and  unknowns can be written as
 

where  are the unknowns and the numbers  are the coefficients of the system.  The coefficient matrix is the  matrix with the coefficient  as the th entry:
 

Then the above set of equations can be expressed more succinctly as 

Relation of its properties to properties of the equation system

By the Rouché–Capelli theorem, the system of equations is inconsistent, meaning it has no solutions, if the rank of the augmented matrix (the coefficient matrix augmented with an additional column consisting of the vector ) is greater than the rank of the coefficient matrix. If, on the other hand, the ranks of these two matrices are equal, the system must have at least one solution. The solution is unique if and only if the rank  equals the number  of variables.

Dynamic equations

A first-order matrix difference equation with constant term can be written as 

A first-order matrix differential equation with constant term can be written as 

This system is stable if and only if all  eigenvalues of  have negative real parts.

References

Linear algebra